Some philosophers have commonly used nicknames.  All the nicknames on this list have sources that attest to their use.

Nicknames
Artist's Philosopher:  Arthur Schopenhauer
Beekeeper Philosopher:  Richard Taylor
Father of Existentialism:  Søren Kierkegaard
Father of Logic:  Aristotle
The Jewish Luther:  Moses Mendelssohn
Laughing Philosopher: Democritus
Longshoreman Philosopher:  Eric Hoffer
Mother of Feminism:  Mary Wollstonecraft
Philosopher of Fascism:  Giovanni Gentile
Plato:  Aristocles son of Ariston, but see Plato#Name.
The Philosopher:  Aristotle
Weeping Philosopher: Heraclitus
Bottled Wasp (aka Wasp in a Bottle): Charles Sanders Peirce
the American Aristotle: Charles Sanders Peirce

References 

Philosophers, List of nicknames of
Nicknames, List of philiosophers
Nicknames in literature